The 1995 Hellmann's Cup was a men's tennis tournament held in Santiago, Chile and played on outdoor clay courts. The tournament was part of the ATP World Series circuit of the 1995 ATP Tour. It was the third edition of the tournament and was held from 23 October through 30 October. Slava Doseděl won the singles title.

Finals

Singles

 Slava Doseděl defeated  Marcelo Ríos 7–6(7–3), 6–3
 It was Doseděl 's only title of the year, and the 1st of his career.

Doubles

 Jiří Novák /  David Rikl defeated  Shelby Cannon /  Francisco Montana, 6–4, 4–6, 6–1
 It was Novak's 2nd title of the year and the 2nd of his career. It was Rikl's 2nd title of the year and the 9th of his career.

References

External links
 ITF tournament edition details

Chile Open (tennis)
Movistar Open
Movistar Open
1995 Movistar Open